Eric Denham (20 September 1929 – 16 March 2015) was a British sailor. He competed in the 5.5 Metre event at the 1964 Summer Olympics.

References

External links
 

1929 births
2015 deaths
British male sailors (sport)
Olympic sailors of Great Britain
Sailors at the 1964 Summer Olympics – 5.5 Metre
People from Cowes